Opposite Worlds was an American reality game show that originally aired on the cable channel SyFy. The format of the show was based on the successful Chilean series Mundos Opuestos which aired from 2012 to 2013 on the cable channel Canal 13. The series revolved around a group of strangers divided into two teams, and made to live in a house divided by "future" and "past" themes. The teams competed in weekly challenges to determine where they would live. One contestant, known as the Decider, selected two contestants to compete in a challenge, with the loser being eliminated from the game. The winner of the series, determined after six weeks, won a $100,000 prize. The series was hosted by Luke Tipple. The show premiered on January 21, 2014 and aired on Tuesdays and Wednesdays, with the latter being a live elimination episode. The show was cancelled after one season.

History
The Chilean series Mundos Opuestos first premiered in January 2012, and featured a total of thirty-two contestants who were both celebrities and non-celebrities, including Richard Rubin of Beauty and the Geek. The series proved to be an early success, and editions for Turkey, Mexico, and the United States were later announced to be in the works. The series was first announced in October 2013, and was slated for a January 2014 release. The series officially launched on January 21, 2014. In a Tweet dated March 1, 2015 the host, Luke Tipple, confirmed the show was canceled.

Format
Opposite Worlds is a game show in which a group of contestants live in isolation from the outside world in a custom built "house", constantly under video surveillance. The house is divided by a "future" (luxurious Space Age) and "past" (primitive Stone Age) theme, with a glass wall dividing the two areas. The contestants are divided into two teams, and participate in a weekly "Worldly Challenge" to determine which area the teams will stay; the winning team is given the option to live in the future or the past. The two teams later select one of their own to be "protected" for the week, and thus are not able to be eliminated that week. Viewers then vote for one of the two protected contestants to become the "Decider", who then select one player from each team to face off in "The Duel of Destiny". The loser of the duel is eliminated from the competition. Though the show is hosted by Luke Tipple, the house also features an electronic voice, Athena, who communicates with those in the "future" area of the house.

While the series was airing, it featured a "Twitter Popularity Index" (TPI), which was used to determine the popularity of each contestant; the most popular contestant received a reward, while the least popular received a punishment.

Season details

Development
The series is based on the Chilean reality series Mundos Opuestos, which premiered in 2012. The Chilean edition featured a mixture of celebrity contestants and non-celebrities, including Richard Rubin of Beauty and the Geek. In October 2012, it was confirmed that SyFy had picked up the rights to air the series for twelve episodes for a total of six weeks. Mark Stern, president of content over SyFy, said the series "has become an absolute phenomenon [...] This groundbreaking, edgy program is a remarkable television experiment transporting the audience and the contestants into starkly opposite worlds, simultaneously." The series was executive produced by JD Roth, Todd A. Nelson, Brant Pinvidic, Adam Kaloustian and Curtis Colden for Eyeworks USA. Casting for the series was done both online and through casting calls, with applicants being able to submit videos to SyFy or to appear at a casting call. It was noted that eight out of the original twelve contestants were from California, while three of the potential four contestants were from California as well. Wyatt, JR, Frank, and Charles were the only contestants who submitted their applications online.

It was announced on January 9, 2014 that Luke Tipple would host the series. Tipple had previously been on television series' for networks such as The CW and the Discovery Channel. The contestants entered the house on January 16, 2014. The cast was revealed on January 14, 2014. Contestants Danielle Pascente and Jeffry Calle were the youngest contestants at age 25; Wyatt Werneth was the oldest at age 47. Rachel Lara is a working actress and starred in Lionsgate's thriller movie, 'Killer Holiday', and had previously been a character model for Capcom's' 'Resident Evil: Operation Raccoon City' video game, while Charles Haskins joined the Marines at the age of 19. Jesse Wilson had previously appeared on the reality series Love in the Wild (2012). Aside from the original twelve contestants, an additional four contestants were revealed to be potential contestants, with the public deciding which two should enter the game. The two contestants selected entered the house at a later date.

Opposite Worlds originally aired on Tuesdays and Wednesdays on the SyFy network. The Wednesday episode of the series was announced to be live, making it the first SyFy series to air live episodes. The show was simulcasted in Canada on Bell Media's Space channel. In addition they hold the rights to produce a local edition of the show.

Contestants

Potential candidates 
Four of the potential cast members were revealed for a public vote prior to the start of the season. The two players with the most votes moved into the house in time for the January 21 taped episode. The poll was won by Mercy and Steve.

Summary
On Day 1, the original twelve players entered the house in two groups; Danielle, Frank, Jeffry, Jesse, Lisette, and Rachel formed the Chronos team, and lived in the future area while Angela, Charles, JR, Lauren, Samm, and Wyatt formed the Epoch team in the past area. The following day, the contestants competed in the first Worldly Challenge, which saw the contestants facing off on a platform attempting to knock one another off using stun guns. During the competition, Charles broke his leg and Lauren broke her finger and sprained her wrist. Though Lauren returned to the game that night, Charles remained outside of the house. Chronos won the competition after it came down to a tie-breaker round, and chose to remain in the future area. On Day 3, Lisette and JR were chosen to be the two protected contestants. On Day 7, It was revealed J.R. won The Decider with 90% of the vote. J.R. decided to put in Angela and Rachel in The Duel in which Angela won.

Game history

Notes

  Represents Team Chronos
  Represents Team Epoch
 After losing the challenge Team Epoch had to vote someone off. They voted off Steve.
 After winning the challenge, each of the two winners pick another to continue as well, effectively removing the two unpicked players.

Reception
NaShantá Fletcher called the show "freakishly addicting."

References

2010s American reality television series
2014 American television series debuts
2014 American television series endings
Syfy original programming
2014 American television seasons